John Bernard "Trick" McSorley (December 6, 1852 – February 9, 1936) was an American professional baseball player. He played all or part of four seasons in Major League Baseball for the St. Louis Red Stockings of the National Association, the St. Louis Maroons of the National League and the Toledo Blue Stockings and St. Louis Browns of the American Association between 1875 and 1886. He played six different positions, including pitcher, but mostly played at first base, third base and left field.

He was apparently removed from the Red Stockings team because of "crooked play", but returned several years later for Toledo.

He died in his home town of St. Louis, Missouri in 1936 of a cerebral hemorrhage.

Notes

External links 

Major League Baseball first basemen
Major League Baseball third basemen
Major League Baseball left fielders
St. Louis Red Stockings players
Toledo Blue Stockings players
St. Louis Maroons players
St. Louis Browns (AA) players
Indianapolis Blues (minor league) players
Buffalo (minor league baseball) players
Peoria Reds players
Memphis Reds players
Milwaukee Brewers (minor league) players
Memphis Grays players
Denver (minor league baseball) players
Davenport (minor league baseball) players
Sacramento Altas players
Peoria Canaries players
Baseball players from St. Louis
19th-century baseball players
1852 births
1936 deaths